Satellize (formerly known as Exseed Space) is the first private Indian company to have a satellite in space. In December 2018, their first satellite was launched into space via SpaceX. They launched their second satellite, AISAT (called ExseedSat-2) for a customer, AMSAT (Radio Amateur Satellite Corporation) India on board the fourth stage of the PSLV-C45.

Exseed Innovations was started in 2017 by Mahesh Murthy, Asshar Farhan, and Kris Nair in Hyderabad. Its focus is on "assembly, integration, testing and operation of satellites" and seeks to "democratize space exploration".

See also 
 
 List of private spaceflight companies
 Pixxel
 Skyroot Aerospace

References 

Private spaceflight companies
Space programme of India
Indian private spaceflight companies
Indian companies established in 2018
2018 establishments in Maharashtra
Companies based in Mumbai